Mario Rodríguez may refer to:

Sports

Association football
 Mario Rodríguez (footballer, born 1937) (1937–2015), Argentine footballer
 Mario Rodríguez (footballer, born 1972), Peruvian footballer
 Mario César Rodríguez (born 1975), Honduran footballer
 Mario-Ernesto Rodríguez (born 1976), Uruguayan-Italian footballer
 Mario Rodríguez (footballer, born 1978), Mexican footballer
 Mario Rodríguez (footballer, born 1981), Guatemalan footballer
 Mario Rodríguez (footballer, born 1991), Mexican footballer
 Mario Rodríguez (soccer, born 1994), American soccer player for Dynamo Dresden
 Mario Rodríguez (footballer, born 1995), Mexican footballer
 Mario Rodríguez (footballer, born 1997), Spanish footballer

Other sports
 Mario Rodríguez (baseball) (1909–?), Cuban baseball player
 Mario Rodríguez (weightlifter), Dominican Republic Olympic weightlifter
 Mario Rodriguez (fencer) (born 1959), American Paralympic fencer
 Mario Rodríguez (boxer) (born 1988), Mexican professional boxer

Others
 Mario Rodríguez Cobos (1938–2010), Spanish-Argentine writer and spiritual leader